Crianlarich is a village in Stirling council area and in the registration county of Perthshire, Scotland, around  north-east of the head of Loch Lomond. The village bills itself as "the gateway to the Highlands".

Etymology
The name Crianlarich is derived probably from the Gaelic meaning either "the wasted site" or "the aspen site" (c.f. Gaelic critheann, "aspen").

Situation
The village lies in the glen of Strath Fillan at the north western extent of the Trossachs, in the shadow of several Munro peaks, notably Ben More, but also Stob Binnein and Cruach Ardrain. Thus Crianlarich is very popular with hillwalkers. Also the village lies  along the long-distance footpath, the West Highland Way.

Its location makes Crianlarich a popular stop for tourists and there are a variety of types of overnight accommodation including guesthouses, B&Bs a SYHA Youth Hostel and a Best Western hotel.

Transport connections
Crianlarich has been a major crossroads for north- and westbound journeys in Scotland since medieval times.

In the 1750s, two military roads met in the village; in the 19th century, it became a railway junction on what is now the West Highland Line; in the 20th century it became the meeting point of the major A82 and A85 roads. As such, it is designated a primary destination in Scotland, signposted from as far as Glasgow in the south, Perth in the east, Oban in the west and Fort William in the north. In the 1960s there was even a direction sign for Crianlarich at Swiss Cottage at Camden in London. Since 2016 the A82 by-passes the centre of the village to avoid the low railway bridge in the village.

The village is served by Crianlarich railway station located on the West Highland Line. The routes to Fort William/Mallaig and Oban diverge after this station. Access to the platform is via a flight of stairs from a subway that runs underneath the tracks, from the car park which is slightly lower than the station itself.

In 2001, the village had a population of 185.

Lochan Saorach
In nearby Glen Dochart lies Lochan Saorach, mentioned by Thomas Pennant in 1769 on account of the floating island it once contained.

Gallery

References

External links

Crianlarich local community website
Crianlarich is in the Church of Scotland  Parish of Strathfillan

Villages in Stirling (council area)